ESIB may refer to:
 Estonian Safety Investigation Bureau
 European Student Information Bureau, now the European Students' Union